Edgar Andres Baumann Dure (born 16 April 1970 in San Lorenzo) is a Paraguayan former Javelin Thrower, current Javelin Coach, Sports Promoter and Businessperson. He is of German descent.

Baumann won a silver medal at the 1995 Pan American Games in Mar del Plata, Argentina, achieving the South American record at the time with a throw of 78.70 metres, surpassing Colombia's thrower Luis Lucumi's throw of 77.80m which was held since 1989. He held the record four times, overtaking temporary record holder and compatriot Nery Kennedy's throw of 81.28m metres in 1998 and extending it to 84.70 metres in Texas, United States of America on 17 October 1999. Baumann was the first South American Javelin thrower to throw over 80 metres.

He qualified for the 1992 Barcelona Olympics, although he did not compete. He competed at an Olympic Games for the first time at Atlanta 1996, reaching a maximum distance of 77.74 metres. His extension to the South American record of 84.70 metres qualified him for the 2000 Sydney Olympics, however, during a scandal which involved the Paraguayan Olympic Committee, without any justification Baumann did not participate and was replaced by Nery Kennedy.

It took him 9 years to sue the Olympic Committee after establishing a lawsuit against them in 2000, Baumann received support from Paraguayan football figure José Luís Chilavert in the process who condemned corruption in Paraguayan sport, culminating with the Paraguayan Supreme Court ruling in favor of the javelin thrower who was awarded a minimum of US$1 million.

Education
Baumann attended Texas State University and was a member of the athletics team, Texas State Bobcats.

Personal life
In November 2016, Crónica newspaper reported that his house had been shot at.

Career

1995
On 21 March 1995, Baumann threw a distance of 78.70 metres at the 1995 Pan American Games in Argentina. He won a silver medal, finishing behind Cuban thrower Emeterio González, who threw 79.28 metres. Baumann's result of 78.70 metres was the then South American record, surpassing Colombia's thrower Luis Lucumi's throw of 77.80m which was held since 1989. He was the only Paraguayan to achieve a medal in athletics at the competition.

"It is difficult to make such an important mark in South America, more being Paraguayan. It is extremely difficult because of adversities." – Said Baumann, among these obstacles he mentioned the lack of support and the directors of his time

In the same year, he threw 72.90m in Sweden at the World Championships, attending the competition again with Cuba's Emeterio González, who reached 76.54m.

1996
Baumann was one of eight track and field athletes at Texas State University who were close to competing at the '96 Olympics.

1999
On 17 October 1999, Baumann threw a distance of 84.70 metres during an encounter in San Marcos, Texas. The result of 84.70 metres increased his continental record for a fourth time, overtaking temporary record holder and compatriot Nery Kennedy's throw of 81.28m metres in 1998, Baumann reached an IAAF ranking of 6th in the world and he qualified for the 2000 Sydney Olympics.

Lawsuit against Paraguayan Olympic Committee
One day before the national delegation traveled to the Sydney Games, Baumann endured sickness and was hospitalized for five days. He did not travel and the Paraguayan Olympic Committee sent Nery Kennedy to the Olympics, resulting in Baumann suing the Olympic Committee for 2 million US Dollars for moral damage. Baumann and tennis player Rossana de los Ríos were left out of the delegation, confirmed by Ramón Zubizarreta, the president of the Paraguayan Olympic Committee.

In an interview with Paraguayan newspaper ABC in 2011, Nery Kennedy recalled that he was called up for the Olympics "at the last minute". The president of the Paraguayan Olympic Committee, Ramón Zubizarreta, said that Edgar Baumann was separated from the team that competed in the Olympic Games for doping cocaine and amphetamines. Baumann said that the alleged doping tests in question were declared "false and irrelevant" in the trial he filed against the authorities of the Paraguayan Olympic Committee. Baumann also denounced an alleged poisoning attempt when he recalled that the then president of the Paraguayan Athletics Federation, Francisco Rojas Soto, allegedly gave him contaminated water  to drink before feeling bad during an exhibition. He added that he did not pass out at the track, he departed on his own and went to the hospital on his own to ask for toxicology tests.

The scandal robbed Edgar Baumann of his right to participate at the Sydney Olympics without any justification, and Nery Kennedy who ultimately finished in 33rd place with a maximum distance of 70.26 m. The qualification mark was set at 83.00 metres, whilst Kennedy had not been ranked within the IAAF top 50 in 1999 nor 2000 in order to qualify.

The incident took a process of 9 years for Edgar Baumann to correctly sue the Olympic Committee, Paraguayan figure José Luis Chilavert backed Edgar Baumann in 2008 and 2009 to fight against the corruption in Paraguayan sport and condemned the actions of the then president of the Olympic Committee, Ramón Zubizarreta, should be expulsed from the Olympic Committee for hurting athletes and not giving them benefits. The former captain of the Paraguay national team also had a lawsuit with Zubizarreta. José Luis Chilavert, along with Claudio Escauriza, Tomás Orué and lawyer Alejandro Rubin, attended a Press Conference at Asunción Shopping Centre Shopping del Sol, in support of Baumann when he eventually had received a favorable ruling from the Paraguay Supreme Court in a case against the Paraguay Olympic Committee president Ramón Zubizarreta for robbing him the right of competing at the 2000 Summer Olympics and also taking his sums of money that he earned from his scholarship.

Several years later, Ramón Zubizarreta was investigated and had files charged against him for the punishable acts of trust and appropriation in 2015. In 2016, the mayor of San Bernardino in Paraguay filed a report for the shortage of 3. 840 million Paraguayan Guaraníes of his predecessor, Zubizarreta.

Coaching and Sports Promoting
In 2013, he coached Paraguayan junior representative Fabian Jara.

On 27 September 2016, ADN Newspaper reports that Baumann presented a project to ITAIPU  to form an athletes and citizen leaders in Paraguay.

El objetivo del plan de propuesta es descubrir el potencial que tiene cada niño y joven y potenciarlo en lo que sabe hacer, siempre teniendo como base al deporte. Claro que esperamos descubrir talentos para el atletismo

"The purpose of the proposal plan is to discover the potential of each child and young person and to empower them in what they know how to do, always based on sport. Of course we hope to discover talents for athletics. We want to take children out of the streets and the dangers of violence and drug addiction" – Baumann

As a resident in Ciudad del Este, he helped in organization of the Asociación de Atletismo del Alto Paraná, athletics club in the same city, in hosting a national athletics competition of the Paraguayan Athletics Federation in Ciudad del Este in November 2016.

Competitions

International competitions

National competitions

Personal best
 Javelin Throw: 84.70m  San Marcos – 17 October 1999

Seasonal bests
1988 - 55.30
1989 - 64.68
1990 - 68.26
1991 - 69.98
1992 - 72.90
1993 - 74.76
1994 - 75.96
1995 - 78.70
1996 - 80.56
1997 - 76.44
1998 - 79.22
1999 - 84.70 (AR)

See also
 List of South American records in athletics
 List of Paraguayan records in athletics

References

External links
 
 
 Profile at Track And Field Statistics

1970 births
Living people
People from San Lorenzo, Paraguay
Paraguayan people of German descent
Paraguayan male javelin throwers
Athletes (track and field) at the 1991 Pan American Games
Athletes (track and field) at the 1995 Pan American Games
Athletes (track and field) at the 1999 Pan American Games
Athletes (track and field) at the 1996 Summer Olympics
Olympic athletes of Paraguay
Pan American Games silver medalists for Paraguay
Pan American Games medalists in athletics (track and field)
World Athletics Championships athletes for Paraguay
South American Games bronze medalists for Paraguay
South American Games medalists in athletics
Competitors at the 1990 South American Games
Competitors at the 1994 South American Games
Medalists at the 1995 Pan American Games